Scamandrus or Skamandros, was a small town in the ancient Troad in ancient Mysia, no doubt situated on the Scamander River in the plain of Troy.

Its site is located near Akköy Yakası, Asiatic Turkey.

References

Populated places in ancient Mysia
Populated places in ancient Troad
Former populated places in Turkey